The 2015 Festival Luxembourgeois du cyclisme féminin Elsy Jacobs was the eighth edition of the Festival Luxembourgeois du cyclisme féminin Elsy Jacobs, a women's road racing event in Luxembourg. It was a stage race with a UCI rating of 2.1. It was won by Anna van der Breggen, beating Annemiek van Vleuten and Lucinda Brand.

Stages

Prologue
1 May 2015 – Garnich to Garnich, individual time trial (ITT)

Stage 1
2 May 2015 – Garnich to Garnich,

Stage 2
3 May 2015 – Mamer to Mamer,

Classification leadership table

References

External links

2015 in women's road cycling
2015 in Luxembourgian sport
Women's road bicycle races
2015 in Luxembourgian women's sport